Anacampta is a genus of picture-winged flies in the family Ulidiidae.

Species
 A. latiusculus
 A. morosa
 A. munda
 A. unimaculata

References

Ulidiidae